Thomas Stewart Udall (born May 18, 1948) is an American diplomat, lawyer and politician serving as the United States Ambassador to New Zealand and Samoa since 2021. A member of the Democratic Party, he served as a United States senator from New Mexico from 2009 to 2021. Born in Tucson, Arizona, he is the son of former U.S. Representative Stewart Udall and the nephew of former U.S. Representative Mo Udall. A member of the Udall family, a western American political family, his relatives include Colorado's Mark Udall and Utah's Mike Lee. He was the dean of New Mexico's congressional delegation. Udall was first elected in the 2008 Senate race. He did not seek a third term in 2020, making him the only Democratic senator to retire that cycle. On July 16, 2021, President Joe Biden nominated Udall to serve as United States Ambassador to New Zealand and Samoa.

Early life, education and law career

Udall was born in Tucson, Arizona, to Ermalee Lenora (née Webb) and Stewart Udall, the Secretary of the Interior from 1961 to 1969. He is of partial Swiss ancestry on his mother's side. He completed his undergraduate education at Prescott College, before going on to receive a Bachelor of Laws degree from the University of Cambridge and a Juris Doctor from the University of New Mexico School of Law.

Early political career
In 1982, Udall ran for Congress in the newly created 3rd district, based in the state capital, Santa Fe, and including most of the north of the state. He lost the Democratic primary to Bill Richardson. In 1988, he ran for Congress again, this time in an election for the Albuquerque-based 1st district seat left open by retiring twenty-year incumbent Manuel Lujan, Jr., but narrowly lost to Bernalillo County District Attorney Steven Schiff. From 1991 to 1999 he served as Attorney General of New Mexico.

U.S. House of Representatives

Elections
Udall ran for Congress again in 1998 in the 3rd district against incumbent Bill Redmond, who had been elected in a 1997 special election to replace Richardson. Redmond was a conservative Republican representing a heavily Democratic district, and Udall defeated Redmond with 53 percent of the vote. He was reelected four more times with no substantive opposition, including an unopposed run in 2002.

Tenure
As a U.S. Representative, Tom Udall was a member of both the centrist New Democrat Coalition and the more liberal Congressional Progressive Caucus. He was a member of the United States House Peak oil Caucus, which he co-founded with Representative Roscoe Bartlett of Maryland.

Committee assignments
Udall sat on the United States House of Representatives Committee on Appropriations in the Subcommittee on Interior, Environment, and Related Agencies, the Subcommittee on Labor, Health and Human Services, Education, and Related Agencies
and the Subcommittee on Legislative Branch.

Caucuses
He was the Co-Vice Chair of the House Native American Caucus and Co-Chair of the International Conservation Caucus.

U.S. Senate

Elections

In November 2007, Udall announced his run for the Senate seat held by retiring six-term incumbent Republican Pete Domenici. Potential Democratic rival Albuquerque Mayor Martin Chavez dropped out, handing Udall the nomination. New Mexico's other two members of the House, 1st and 2nd district's Heather Wilson and Steve Pearce, ran in the Republican primary. Pearce won the Republican nomination, and lost to Udall, who won 61 percent of the vote.

While Udall ran for Senate in New Mexico, his younger first cousin, Congressman Mark Udall, ran for the Senate in Colorado. Their double second cousin, incumbent Gordon Smith of Oregon, also ran for reelection. Both Udalls won but Smith lost.

Tenure
He voted in favor of the Don't Ask, Don't Tell Repeal Act of 2010, FDA Food Safety Modernization Act, DREAM Act, American Recovery and Reinvestment Act of 2009, Patient Protection and Affordable Care Act, Children's Health Insurance Program Reauthorization Act, and the Lilly Ledbetter Fair Pay Act of 2009.

Udall was one of the first members of Congress to publicly express concern about the possibility of NSA overreach, a year before Edward Snowden's 2013 disclosure of the PRISM program.

On March 25, 2019, Udall announced that he would not run for reelection in 2020.

In November 2020, it was reported that Udall was being considered for Secretary of the Interior in the Biden Administration.

Legislation

On March 19, 2013, Udall introduced into the Senate the Sandia Pueblo Settlement Technical Amendment Act (S. 611; 113th Congress), a bill that would transfer some land to the Sandia Pueblo tribe.

Also during the 113th Congress, Udall introduced a proposed amendment to the Constitution that would reverse Citizens United and allow limits on outside spending in support of political candidates. The Amendment won the approval of the Senate Judiciary Committee on a 10-8 vote in July 2014.

In March 2015 Udall sponsored Senate bill 697, the Frank R. Lautenberg Chemical Safety for the 21st Century Act, a bill to amend and reauthorize the Toxic Substances Control Act. The legislation, as amended, was signed into law by President Barack Obama on June 22, 2016. It updated the nation's safety system for thousands of chemicals in products like cleaners, paints, carpets and furniture. The bill initially faced criticism over the balance between federal and state authority to regulate chemicals, but after changes to the legislation, it earned broader support, including from liberal members of the Senate and the President. It passed by a vote of 403-12 in the House and voice vote in the Senate.

In March 2019, he and Rand Paul co-sponsored the bipartisan AFGHAN Service Act to compensate members of the armed forces and repeal the 2001 Authorization for Use of Military Force Against Terrorists at the end of the Afghanistan withdrawal.

Committee assignments
Udall's committee assignments included:
 Committee on Appropriations
 Subcommittee on Agriculture, Rural Development, Food and Drug Administration, and Related Agencies
 Subcommittee on Energy and Water Development
 Subcommittee on Financial Services and General Government
 Subcommittee on Interior, Environment, and Related Agencies (Ranking Member)
 Subcommittee on Military Construction, Veterans Affairs, and Related Agencies
 Committee on Foreign Relations
 Subcommittee on African Affairs
 Subcommittee on East Asian and Pacific Affairs
 Subcommittee on International Development and Foreign Assistance, Economic Affairs and International Environmental Protection, and Peace Corps
 Subcommittee on Western Hemisphere and Global Narcotics Affairs
 Committee on Commerce, Science, and Transportation
 Committee on Indian Affairs
 Committee on Rules and Administration
 Commission on Security and Cooperation in Europe
 International Narcotics Control Caucus

Caucuses
 Congressional Law Enforcement Caucus
 House Native American Caucus (Co-Vice Chair)
 International Conservation Caucus (Co-Chair)
 Rural Caucus
 Sportsmen's Caucus
 Afterschool Caucuses

Political positions

Gun law
In 2013, Udall voted for state-by-state reciprocity of concealed carry and for the names of gun owners to be protected and released only in select situations. In 2016, within weeks of the Orlando nightclub shooting, he participated in a sit-in at the House to demand votes on gun control legislation, saying, "We owe it to the LGBT community & all families harmed by gun violence to keep terror suspects fr[om] obtaining guns." In 2017, Udall had a "C−" rating from the National Rifle Association and a "F" rating from the Gun Owners of America for his support of gun control.

Environmental issues 
Udall has a lifetime score of 96% from the League of Conservation Voters. In 2018 he received the Sierra Club's top award for public officials, the Edgar Wayburn Award.

In September 2019, Udall was one of eight senators to sign a bipartisan letter to congressional leadership requesting full and lasting funding of the Land and Water Conservation Act to aid national parks and public lands, benefit the $887 billion American outdoor recreation economy, and "ensure much-needed investment in our public lands and continuity for the state, tribal, and non-federal partners who depend on them."

In late 2019, Udall co-sponsored the Green New Deal, a policy introduced in the U.S. Senate that would establish net-zero carbon emissions by 2050.

Ambassador to New Zealand and Samoa 

On July 16, 2021, President Joe Biden nominated Udall to serve as United States Ambassador to New Zealand and Samoa. On September 22, a hearing on his nomination was held before the Senate Foreign Relations Committee. On October 19, his nomination was reported favorably out of committee. The Senate confirmed Udall by voice vote on October 26.

Udall presented his credentials to the New Zealand governor-general, Dame Cindy Kiro, in Wellington on December 2, 2021. On February 17, 2022, he virtually presented his credentials to the Head of State of Samoa, Afioga Tuimalealiʻifano Vaʻaletoʻa Sualauvi II.

Electoral history

1990

2008

2014

Personal life
Udall is married to Jill Cooper Udall. They live in Santa Fe with their daughter, Amanda Cooper. Tom Udall is the son of former Arizona Congressman and Interior Secretary Stewart Lee Udall,  nephew of Arizona Congressman Morris Udall, and first cousin of former Colorado U.S. Senator Mark Udall, double second cousin of former Oregon U.S. Senator Gordon Smith, and second cousin of Utah U.S. Senator Mike Lee. Udall is a member of The Church of Jesus Christ of Latter-day Saints.

See also
 Lee–Hamblin family

References

External links

 
 
 Biography at Ballotpedia
 Congressional profile at GovTrack
 Financial information (federal office) at OpenSecrets

|-

|-

|-

|-

|-

|-

|-

|-

1948 births
21st-century American politicians
Alumni of Downing College, Cambridge
Ambassadors of the United States to New Zealand
Ambassadors of the United States to Samoa
American Latter Day Saints
Democratic Party members of the United States House of Representatives from New Mexico
Democratic Party United States senators from New Mexico
Lawyers from Tucson, Arizona
Living people
New Mexico Attorneys General
Politicians from Santa Fe, New Mexico
Politicians from Tucson, Arizona
Prescott College alumni
Udall family
University of New Mexico School of Law alumni
American people of Swiss descent